The Upper Nyack Snowshoe Cabin, built in 1926 in Glacier National Park, is a significant resource both architecturally and historically as a shelter, usually 8–12 miles apart, for patrolling backcountry rangers. The design is similar to that used in Yellowstone National Park, which was in turn adapted from U.S. Forest Service shelters, which were themselves adaptations of trapper cabins. Upper Nyack retains some original interior furnishings, including hanging beds.

See also
Lower Nyack Snowshoe Cabin

References

Park buildings and structures on the National Register of Historic Places in Montana
Residential buildings completed in 1932
Log cabins in the United States
National Register of Historic Places in Flathead County, Montana
Log buildings and structures on the National Register of Historic Places in Montana
1926 establishments in Montana
National Register of Historic Places in Glacier National Park
Rustic architecture in Montana
1932 establishments in Montana